Ajouré is a style of jewellery design similar to filigree, which leaves open spaces in the worked metal. Unlike filigree, the holes are usually cut from the metal rather than being incorporated during the process of construction. It is usually used in the making of gold jewellery, such as pendants and brooches. The result is reminiscent of the style of lace known as "ajour", hence the term.

See also
Openwork

References

Jewellery making